Room is a 2010 novel by Irish-Canadian author Emma Donoghue. The story is told from the perspective of a five-year-old boy, Jack, who is being held captive in a small room along with his mother. Donoghue conceived the story after hearing about five-year-old Felix in the Fritzl case.

The novel was longlisted for the 2011 Orange Prize and won the 2011 Commonwealth Writers' Prize regional prize (Caribbean and Canada). It was shortlisted for the Booker Prize in 2010, and was shortlisted for the 2010 Rogers Writers' Trust Fiction Prize and the 2010 Governor General's Awards.

The film adaptation, also titled Room, was released in October 2015, starring Brie Larson and Jacob Tremblay. The film was a critical and commercial success; it received four nominations at the 88th Academy Awards including for Best Picture, and won Best Actress for Larson.

Plot summary

Five-year old Jack lives with his 27-year old Ma in "Room", a secured single-room outbuilding containing a small kitchen, a basic bathroom, a wardrobe, a bed, and a TV set. Because it is all he has ever known, Jack believes that only Room and the things it contains (including himself and Ma) are "real." Ma, unwilling to disappoint Jack with a life she cannot give him, allows Jack to believe that the rest of the world exists only on television. Ma tries her best to keep Jack healthy and happy via both physical and mental exercises, keeping a healthy diet, limiting TV-watching time, and strict body and oral hygiene. The only other person Jack has ever seen is "Old Nick," who visits Room at night while Jack sleeps hidden in a wardrobe. Old Nick brings them food and necessities. Jack is unaware that Old Nick kidnapped Ma when she was 19 years old and has kept her imprisoned for the past seven years. Old Nick regularly rapes Ma; Jack is the product of one such sexual assault.

A week after Jack's fifth birthday, Ma learns Old Nick has been unemployed for the past six months and is in danger of losing his home to foreclosure. Feeling certain that Old Nick would kill them both before letting them free, Ma comes up with a plan to get Jack out of Room by convincing Old Nick that Jack is deathly ill. Jack is unable to conceptualize being outside of Room or interacting with other people, but Ma eventually convinces him to help her. When Old Nick refuses to take Jack to a hospital, Ma then pretends that Jack has died. Old Nick removes Jack, wrapped in a rug, from Room. Jack escapes Old Nick and manages to reach a friendly stranger who contacts the police. In spite of his inability to communicate effectively, Jack describes the route to Room to an officer to free Ma.

The two are taken to a mental hospital, where they receive medical evaluations and a temporary home. Old Nick is found and faces numerous charges of abduction, rape, and child endangerment that will likely lead to 25 years to life in prison. While in the hospital, Ma is reunited with her family and begins to relearn how to interact with the larger world, while Jack, overwhelmed by new experiences and people, wants only to return to the safety of Room. Meanwhile, the case has attracted much attention from the public and the mass media, making it even harder for Jack and Ma to start leading a normal life. After a television interview ends badly, Ma suffers a mental breakdown and attempts suicide. While Ma is in the hospital, Jack lives with his grandmother and her new partner. Without the security of his mother nearby, Jack becomes even more confused and frustrated by his surroundings, including his new extended family, who, while kind and loving, often do not understand how Jack's limited experience, particularly his concept of personal boundaries, impact his behavior.

After Ma recovers, she and Jack move into an independent living residence, where they begin making plans for the future. Ma's growing independence conflicts with Jack's desire to keep her for himself, just as they used to be. At the same time, Jack himself is growing and changing as his world expands. Finally, Jack asks to visit Room. He and Ma return to the scene of their captivity, but Jack no longer feels any emotional attachment toward it and is able to say his goodbyes before he and Ma leave Room for the final time.

Awards and honours

New York Times bestseller (Fiction, 2010)
Booker Prize, shortlist (2010)
Rogers Writers' Trust Fiction Prize (2010)
Indigo Books Heather's Pick (2010)
New York Times Best Books of the Year (2010)
New York Times Notable Book of the Year (Fiction & Poetry, 2010)
Salon Book Award (Fiction, 2010)
Governor General's Award shortlist (Fiction, 2010)
Publishers Weekly Listen Up Award (Audio Book of the Year, 2010)
Goodreads Choice Awards, Best Fiction (2010)
Alex Award (2011)
ALA Notable Book (2011)
Hughes & Hughes Irish Novel of the Year, Irish Book Awards (2010)
Commonwealth Writers' Prize (Canada and the Caribbean, 2011)
Indies Choice Book Award (Adult Fiction, 2011)
Orange Prize, shortlist (2011)
WH Smith Paperback of the Year, Galaxy National Book Awards (2011)
International Dublin Literary Award nomination (2012)

Adaptations

A film adaptation, directed by Lenny Abrahamson and written by Donoghue, was made in 2015. The film stars Brie Larson, Joan Allen, William H. Macy, Sean Bridgers, and Jacob Tremblay. It was shown in the Special Presentations section of the 2015 Toronto International Film Festival, after premiering at the  Telluride Film Festival. The film began a limited release on October 16, 2015, and was released nationwide on November 6, 2015, by A24 Films. The film received widespread critical acclaim and won numerous awards. It  received four nominations at the 88th Academy Awards including Best Picture, Best Director, Best Adapted Screenplay  and winning Best Actress for Larson. Donoghue herself received honours for her adaptation of her novel, including Best Adapted Screenplay at the 4th Canadian Screen Awards and Best Scriptwriter at the 13th Irish Film & Television Awards.

Donoghue also adapted her script for the stage. The play with music premiered 10 May 2017 at the Theatre Royal Stratford East to largely positive reviews.

See also
Rape in fiction

References

External links
Novel's official website
Page for Room on Donoghue's website

2010 Canadian novels
Novels by Emma Donoghue
Picador (imprint) books
Canadian novels adapted into films
Irish novels adapted into films
Novels about rape
Works about children
Kidnapping in fiction